Ptychopseustis impar is a moth in the family Crambidae. It is found in Sudan.

References

Endemic fauna of Sudan
Cybalomiinae
Moths described in 1905